The 2002 Saskatchewan Scott Tournament of Hearts women's provincial curling championship, was held January 23–27 at the Melfort Northern Lights Palace in Melfort, Saskatchewan. The winning team of Sherry Anderson, represented Saskatchewan at the 2002 Scott Tournament of Hearts in Brandon, Manitoba, where the team finished round robin with a 9–2 record, before losing to Team Canada's Colleen Jones.

Teams

 Sue Altman
 Sherry Anderson
 Jan Betker
 June Campbell
 Amber Holland
 Michelle Ridgway
 Patty Rocheleau
 Tracy Streifel

Standings

Playoffs

Semifinal
January 29, 1:00 PM CT

Final
January 29, 5:00 PM CT

References

Saskatchewan Scotties Tournament Of Hearts, 2002
2002 in Saskatchewan
Curling in Saskatchewan